The following is a list of episodes of the CGI-animated television series Bratz.

The TV specials were produced using Alias Wavefront Maya 3D software.

The show is currently airing reruns on Kabillion.

Series overview

Episodes

Season 1 (20052006)

Season 2 (2008)

Specials

References

Episodes
Bratz